Aglona Municipality is a former municipality in Latgale, Latvia. The municipality was formed in 2009 by merging Aglona Parish, Grāveri Parish, Kastuļina Parish and Šķeltova Parish, the administrative centre being Aglona. The population in 2020 was 3,099.

On 1 July 2021, Aglona Municipality ceased to exist. Aglona Parish was merged into Preiļi Municipality and Grāveri Parish, Kastuļina Parish and Šķeltova Parish were merged into Krāslava Municipality.

See also 
 Administrative divisions of Latvia (2009)

References 

 
Former municipalities of Latvia
Populated places disestablished in 2021